The top 25 scorers in National Football League history are all placekickers. Statistics include regular season scoring only.

List

Key

Updated through the 2022 season.

Non-kickers
The top five scoring non-kickers in NFL history are listed here with their overall scoring rank. Only one non-kicker, Jerry Rice, is in the top 50 scorers of all-time.

See also
 List of National Football League annual scoring leaders
 List of National Football League records (individual)

References

Scoring Leaders
National Football League lists